YorkMix Radio is a British radio station broadcasting in the city of York, in North Yorkshire. It was founded in early 2021, following the sale and re-branding of Minster FM as Greatest Hits Radio, and features a number of the presenters and staff who previously operated Minster FM. It is owned by YorkMix, who operate a local news website for the York area.

History
Following the end of locally based programming on Minster FM, the operators of local news website YorkMix started a crowdfunding campaign to raise funds for a replacement local radio station. The station launched in November 2020 as XmasMix Radio playing Christmas-themed tracks before its full programming launch on 4 January 2021.

Programming
YorkMix Radio features a mix of Adult Contemporary music through much of its broadcast day, alongside local news and features. The station also produces outside broadcasts from events within the area as well as for its commercial partners.

Transmission
The station transmits on the MuxCo North Yorkshire DAB multiplex, covering most of the county of North Yorkshire.

Notable presenters
Ben Fry (Breakfast Presenter) 
Laura Castle (Breakfast Presenter)
David Green (Presenter)
Victoria Charles (Presenter)
Tim Litchfield (Presenter)
David Dunning (News Presenter)

Notes

Radio stations established in 2021
Radio stations in Yorkshire
Adult contemporary radio stations in the United Kingdom